Wilhelm Weber may refer to:

Wilhelm Eduard Weber (1804–1891), German physicist
Wilhelm Weber (gymnast) (1880–1963), German Olympic gymnast 
Wilhelm Weber (SS officer) (1918–1980), Waffen-SS officer
Willi Weber (Wilhelm Friedrich Weber, born 1942), motorsport manager

See also
William Weber (disambiguation)